Raphael Vieira de Oliveira (born 14 June 1979) is a Brazilian volleyball player,   a member of Brazil men's national volleyball team and Italian club BluVolley Verona, a silver medalist of the 2014 World Championship, South American Champion (2005, 2009, 2015).

Sporting achievements

Clubs

CEV Champions League
  2009/2010 - with Itas Diatec Trentino
  2010/2011 - with Itas Diatec Trentino
  2011/2012 - with Itas Diatec Trentino
  2013/2014 - with Halkbank Ankara

FIVB Club World Championship
  Qatar 2009 - with Itas Diatec Trentino
  Qatar 2010 - with Itas Diatec Trentino
  Qatar 2011 - with Itas Diatec Trentino
  Qatar 2012 - with Itas Diatec Trentino

South American Club Championship
  2016 Brazil, with Funvic Taubaté
  2020 – with Funvic Taubaté

National championship
 2002/2003  Brazilian Cup, with Ulbra São Paulo
 2002/2003  Brazilian Championship, with Ulbra São Paulo
 2005/2006  Russian Cup, with VC Zenit Kazan
 2009/2010  Italian Cup Serie A, with Itas Diatec Trentino
 2009/2010  Italian Championship, with Itas Diatec Trentino
 2010/2011  Italian Championship, with Itas Diatec Trentino
 2011/2012  Italian Cup Serie A, with Itas Diatec Trentino
 2011/2012  Italian Championship, with Itas Diatec Trentino
 2012/2013  Italian Cup Serie A, with Itas DiatescTrentino
 2012/2013  Italian Championship, with Itas Diatec Trentino
 2013/2014  Turkish SuperCup 2013, with Halkbank Ankara
 2013/2014  Turkish Championship, with Halkbank Ankara
 2014/2015  Brazilian Cup, with Funvic Taubaté
 2014/2015  Brazilian Championship, with Funvic Taubaté
 2015/2016  Brazilian Championship, with Funvic Taubaté
 2016/2017  Brazilian Cup, with Funvic Taubaté
 2018/2019  Brazilian Superliga, with Funvic Taubaté

National team
 2005  South American Championship
 2009  South American Championship
 2013  FIVB World Grand Champions Cup
 2014  FIVB World League
 2014  FIVB World Championship
 2015  South American Championship

Individually
 2009 FIVB Club World Championship - Best Setter
 2010 FIVB Club World Championship - Best Setter
 2011 FIVB Club World Championship - Best Setter
 2014 CEV Champions League - Best Setter
 2014 FIVB Club World Championship - Best Setter

References

External links
 FIVB Biography

1979 births
Living people
Brazilian men's volleyball players
Brazilian expatriates in Russia
Expatriate volleyball players in Russia
Brazilian expatriates in Italy
Expatriate volleyball players in Italy
Brazilian expatriate sportspeople in Turkey
Expatriate volleyball players in Turkey
Setters (volleyball)